CER-GS (Celtic Extended Roman GS) is a character encoding for Windows CeltScript fonts. It is deprecated by Extended Latin-8, which contains the euro and disunifies the ampersands (both of these were done in an August 1998 update of Extended Latin-8).

Character set

 The character 0x26 maps to both & and ⁊ (Unicode character U+204A), which are unified.

References

Windows code pages